The canton of Caen-4 is an administrative division of the Calvados department, northwestern France. Its borders were modified at the French canton reorganisation which came into effect in March 2015. Its seat is in Caen.

Composition

It consists of the following communes:
Caen (partly)

Councillors

References

Cantons of Calvados (department)